Alexey Yakovlevich Kuznetsov (1910, Moscow –  1969, Moscow) was a Soviet engineer, Hero of Socialist Labor (1961).

Biography 
Alexey Kuznetsov was born in 1910 in Moscow. He graduated from high school, Rabfak and Moscow Power Engineering Institute. Since 1933 he worked on the construction of Moscow Canal.

He took an active part in the construction of the Uglich and Rybinsk power plant and waterworks, flooding large areas of Rybinsk Reservoir. Since 1956, Kuznetsov was the chief engineer of construction management  Stalingradgidrostroy.  Under his leadership, carried out the construction of the Stalingrad (now - the Volga Hydroelectric Station) hydropower plant.

Presidium of the Supreme Soviet of the Soviet Union on September 9, 1961 for  Alexey Kuznetsov was awarded the title of Hero of Socialist Labor with delivery Order of Lenin and medal Hammer and Sickle.

Since 1962, Kuznetsov served as Deputy Head of the Department of construction of energy facilities of the Ministry of Energy and Electrification of the USSR. Soon, he was sent to Egypt, the chief engineer of construction management, is engaged in construction Aswan Dam. In 1968, he fell ill and went to Moscow for treatment. He died a few months later, in 1969.

References

External links
 К 50-летию со дня пуска первого агрегата Волжской ГЭС
 Колумбарий Новой, Новейшей территорий

1910 births
1969 deaths
Heroes of Socialist Labour
Recipients of the Order of Lenin
Burials at Novodevichy Cemetery
Soviet civil engineers

ru:Кузнецов, Алексей Яковлевич